Shakeel Ahmed Khan (born May 28, 1968, Lahore, Punjab) is a former Pakistani cricketer who played one ODI in 1987.

References 

1968 births
Living people
Pakistan One Day International cricketers
Habib Bank Limited cricketers
Pakistani cricketers
Water and Power Development Authority cricketers
Rawalpindi cricketers
Islamabad cricketers
Cricketers from Lahore